Joseph Armand Roch Voisine,  (born 26 March 1963) is a Canadian singer-songwriter, actor, and radio and television host who lives in Montreal and Paris. He writes and performs material in both English and French. He won the Juno Award for Male Vocalist of the Year in 1994. In 1997, he was made an Officer of the Order of Canada.

Beginnings
Born in Edmundston, New Brunswick, Canada, he grew up in Saint-Basile, New Brunswick and later moved to Notre-Dame-du-Lac, Quebec when he was 12.

Voisine studied at École technique des métiers de Lauzon in Lévis (today Guillaume-Couture Secondary School) and at Polyvalente de Lévis (today École Pointe-Lévy). Then he continued for 4 years at Cégep Limoilou. He attended the University of Ottawa where he graduated in 1985 with a degree in physiotherapy and played 4 seasons with the uOttawa Gee-Gees men's hockey team.

Voisine aspired to be a professional ice hockey player. He had to set his plans aside when he was severely injured while playing baseball in 1981.

Career
In the summer of 1986, he had his music debut when he sang on Canada Day (1 July) in front of 50,000 people at la Ronde amusement park in Montreal. He also worked as presenter of music videos on Top Jeunesse on the TQS (Télévision Quatre-Saisons) private French Quebec channel. In 1989, he appeared as Dany Ross in the CBC Television series Lance et Compte (He Shoots, He Scores).

Voisine's musical breakthrough came with his 1989 album Hélène which sold three million copies and became a major hit not only in Quebec but also in France, Belgium and Switzerland. In 1990, Hélène was awarded the Best Album prize at the Victoires de la Musique. He capitalized on his big success by releasing a bilingual French/English album Double with one CD containing all-French songs, the other all-English songs trying to position himself in both francophone and anglophone markets.

After a highly successful European Tour in 1991, he was awarded France's Chevalier de l'Ordre des Arts et des Lettres, becoming the youngest artist to receive it at age 28. His second European tour culminated on 17 April 1992 at Champ-de-Mars in Paris where he sang in front of 75,000 people. The show was broadcast live on TF1 and reached 14 million viewers.

In 1993, Voisine had his biggest English-language hit to date with the single and album both entitled I'll Always Be There, on which he worked with David Foster. The single reached number four on the Canadian music charts while the album reached number seven. Also in 1993, his wax statue was launched in Musée Grévin in Paris. In 2004, he had a huge success with the traditional song "Jean Johnny Jean" written by Gildas Arzel. The song appeared in Voisine's album Coup de tête.

Over the years, he has continued alternating between recording both French and English-language albums. His French language work and concert tours have continued to enjoy success in Europe (especially France) and Quebec, while his English-language recordings are a frequent mainstay of Canadian adult contemporary radio. He also enjoys huge success internationally.

In 2006, he took part alongside other musicians in L'Or de nos vies in a formation named Fight Aids singing a song composed by Kyo. Revenues went to Fight Aids Monaco.

Université de Moncton, New Brunswick, Canada gave him an honorary doctorate in music in May 2007.

In the years 2008 to 2010, he launched his Americana series recorded in Nashville, Tennessee in tribute to American popular and country music. The third in the Americana series was dedicated to California music. In 2010 he also released the album Confidences in 2 separate European and Canadian editions.  He was also one of the commentators for the men's hockey tournament for French television at the 2010 Winter Olympics in Vancouver. In 2013 he came back with an album of duos called Duophonique.

He was inducted as a Chevalier de l'Ordre des Arts et des Lettres by France in 1992 and was made an Officer of the Order of Canada in 1995. He was made a Member of the Order of New Brunswick in 2014.

Personal life
Roch Voisine was born in Edmundston, New Brunswick, Canada to Réal Voisine, former mayor of Notre-Dame-du-Lac, Quebec and a former English teacher, and to Zélande Robichaud, a former nurse. He grew up in Saint-Basile, New Brunswick. He was the oldest of three children. His brother Marc was born in 1965, and his sister, Janice, in 1966.

When Roch was four years old, Voisine's parents divorced and he moved to live with his paternal grandparents, Maurille and Dorina Racine Voisine, until he was eight, when he went to live with his father again. Roch considered his grandparents very influential on him, even as an adult. Roch moved to Notre-Dame-du-Lac when he was 12.

Voisine married Myriam Saint-Jean on 21 December 2002. The couple have two sons. On 15 October 2007, Voisine's website announced his and Myriam's separation. Later on, he had a short-lived relationship with Narimane Doumandji, a public relations specialist. He has been with Myriam Chantal since 2012 and the couple had a baby girl, Lily-Dorina, born July 1st, 2020.

Discography

Albums
(Lack of positions prior to 1999 in Belgium, France and Switzerland does not mean necessarily that the albums did not chart. They may have charted, but lescharts.com lacks archives for albums for the period prior to 1999)

AAlbums with separate Canadian and European editions.

Singles (English Language / Canada)

Singles (Europe / French Canada)

Filmography
1989: Lance et Compte (He Shoots, He Scores) as Dany Ross (CBC Television series). It was broadcast also on TV5 with French subtitles as Cogne et Gagne
1992:  Armen and Bullik as police detective Tom Bullik (TV film)
2004: Cyberchase - Coach (Penguin tears), Doctor (A Change of Art), Octionier, vender, additional voices (The Snelfu Snafu), additional voices

References

External links
 Official website
 
 Roch Voisine's archives
 StarQuebec: Coffre aux souvenirs - Roch Voisine

1963 births
Acadian people
Canadian male singer-songwriters
Canadian country singer-songwriters
Canadian pop singers
Chevaliers of the Ordre des Arts et des Lettres
French-language singers of Canada
Juno Award for Francophone Album of the Year winners
Living people
Members of the Order of New Brunswick
Musicians from Edmundston
Officers of the Order of Canada
People from Bas-Saint-Laurent
Singers from Quebec
University of Ottawa alumni
Juno Award for Artist of the Year winners